Pol Beh Pain Rural District is a rural district (dehestan) in Simakan District, Jahrom County, Fars Province, Iran. In 2006, its population was 5,028, in 1,055 families.  The rural district has 14 villages.

References 

Rural Districts of Fars Province
Jahrom County